Rai is a village and development block in Sonepat tehsil of Sonepat district in Haryana state of India. It is located just 1  km from Sonepat.

Demography
It has a population  5,278 people in 1,119 households, as per 2011 census of India.

Rai industrial estate

Rai is in the influence zone of Amritsar Delhi Kolkata Industrial Corridor and Eastern Dedicated Freight Corridor in NCR region. HSIIDC has established an industrial estate to boost the economic growth. In 2012, the estate has 800 with an annual turnover of around INR 12000 crore (120 billion).

Education
Motilal Nehru School of Sports, Rai is located at Rai.

References

See also
 List of HSIIDC Industrial Estates

Villages in Sonipat district